Cárcel Hill (Cerro Cárcel) is one of the 42 hills of Valparaíso, Chile. It is the site of the city's old infamous prison, which has now been turned into an urban cultural center.

References

Hills of Valparaíso
Defunct prisons in Chile
Chilean culture